NTZ may mean

 "Number of trailing zeros", see find first set
 NTZ Stadium, homeground of SKA-Sverdlovsk
 Natuzzi (NYSE ticker symbol)
the ISO code of the Saudi Arabian–Iraqi neutral zone